Frances Clark (1905–1998) was an American pianist and academic.

Frances Clark may also refer to:
 Frances Elliott Clark (1860–1958), American music-appreciation advocate
 Frances Naomi Clark (1894–1987), American icthyologist

See also 
 Frances Clarke (disambiguation)
 Francis Clark (disambiguation)
 Francis Clarke (disambiguation)